Richard Jay Franklin II (born October 5, 1974) is an American businessman and retired mixed martial artist. He is best known for competing in the Ultimate Fighting Championship, where he is a member of the UFC Hall of Fame and a former UFC Middleweight Champion. Franklin has been the Vice President of Singaporean combat sports promotion ONE Championship since May 2014.

Background
Franklin was born to Richard Sr. and Vaila Franklin. The couple divorced when Franklin was five years old. He has one biological brother, Greg, and five half-siblings.

Franklin graduated from William Henry Harrison High School. He earned a bachelor's degree in mathematics and later earned a master's degree in education at the University of Cincinnati. He taught mathematics at the Oak Hills High School in Cincinnati, Ohio.

His nickname, "Ace," comes from his resemblance to the actor Jim Carrey, who played the character Ace Ventura. Joe Rogan once called Franklin "Angry Jim Carrey".

Franklin is a born-again Christian and quotes Psalm 144:1 on his webpage and fighter gear.

February 21, 2006 was officially named "Rich Franklin Day" in Cincinnati by the city's mayor.

Business
American Fighter

In 2002, Franklin and his business partner, Jeff Adler, created the American Fighter athletic clothing brand. The brand featured t-shirts, but quickly grew to feature a full line of athletic training clothing, casual wear, and training gear for martial arts. In 2012, Affliction Clothing expressed interest in the name and its widespread appeal. They acquired the majority of the company and brought the brand to mainstream retailers, where it continues to grow.

Ze/Lin
	
In October 2013, Franklin and friend and business partner, Billy Zebe, launched Ze/Lin Organic Juice & Fusion Café in Beverly Hills, California. It closed nine months later and the company focused on wholesaling and distribution for the bottled juices.

ONE Championship

In May 2014, Franklin signed on as a vice president in the ONE Championship organization, a Singapore-based combat sports promotion which officially launched on July 14, 2011. Franklin serves as a face of the brand and travels throughout the US and Asia hosting seminars and speaking engagements, promoting fights, and working with the fighters. He hosts Rich Franklin's ONE Warrior Series, where he recruits up-and-coming martial artists for the promotion.

Mixed martial arts
According to Franklin, he first learned karate at the Harrison Okinawan Karate Dojo in the early 1990s under Bill George and Steve Rafferty.  He also studied submission fighting from instructional video tapes. He has been associated with and trained with Meat Truck, Inc. and currently trains at facilities run by Brazilian jiu-jitsu black belt Jorge Gurgel (New Generation Martial Arts), Neal Rowe, a Muay Thai instructor (Sacan Martial Arts), and Rob Radford, a boxing instructor (Boxing 4 Fitness).

Franklin is currently ranked as a black belt in Brazilian jiu-jitsu under Jorge Gurgel, which he earned on October 11, 2014. After losing his title to Anderson Silva, Franklin started training under Matt "The Wizard" Hume.

UFC career
Franklin began his UFC career with a perfect 3–0 start, including a victory over MMA veteran Evan Tanner at UFC 42, Edwin Dewees at UFC 44, and Jorge Rivera at UFC 50.

On April 5, 2005, Franklin fought in the main event of The Ultimate Fighter 1 Finale, which was the first live UFC card on free cable TV. He faced former UFC champion Ken Shamrock. Franklin defeated Shamrock by TKO at 2:42 of the first round, becoming the first person to stop Shamrock via strikes. The win established Franklin as one of the UFC's biggest stars and ensured him a title opportunity.

Middleweight title
A title shot came at UFC 53 on June 5, 2005. Franklin defeated Evan Tanner for a second time to win the UFC Middleweight Championship. The victory led to Franklin being named a coach, along with welterweight champion Matt Hughes, on the second season of The Ultimate Fighter.

At UFC 56 on November 19, 2005, Franklin defended his title against Nate Quarry, a competitor from season 1 of The Ultimate Fighter. Franklin won the fight via a first-round knockout.

At UFC 58 on March 4, 2006, Franklin defeated David Loiseau in a unanimous five-round decision to retain his title. Franklin broke his left hand early in the second round. The injury required surgery, including a metal plate and screws, and Franklin was out of action for six months.

Losing the title
At UFC 64 on October 14, 2006, Franklin lost his title to Anderson Silva. Their fight was stopped by TKO (knees) at 2:49 of the first round after Franklin received a knee to the face. Franklin was caught in a clinch by Silva and received a flurry of knees and kicks that rendered him unable to continue. On October 19, Franklin underwent surgery due to a nasal fracture he received during the fight.

Franklin made his return at UFC 68 on March 3, 2007 against Jason MacDonald. Franklin showed superior striking during the fight, mounted MacDonald in the closing seconds of the second round, and caused significant injury and swelling around MacDonald's left eye. MacDonald's corner advised ending the fight and Franklin was declared the winner by TKO (corner stoppage) between rounds. After the fight, Franklin called Anderson Silva to the octagon and said that he and Dana White had agreed to a fight for the title in Franklin's hometown of Cincinnati.

Return to contention
Franklin fought world ranked Yushin Okami at UFC 72 in Belfast, Northern Ireland on June 16, 2007. Franklin defeated the top middleweight contender by unanimous decision to be officially announced as the number one contender for Silva's middleweight title. The bout was only his second overall fight to go the full distance (due to being a non-title fight, it was three rounds). All three judges scored the bout 29–28 to Franklin. He also became the first person to fight in a UFC main event in Northern Ireland.

Franklin fought Silva for a second time at UFC 77 on October 20, 2007. Prior to the bout, he signed a six-fight contract with the UFC. Silva was able to effectively neutralize Franklin in the clinch, eventually defeating the former champion via TKO (knees) at 1:07 of the second round.

After his second loss to Anderson, Franklin began making regular trips to Seattle, WA to train with Matt Hume of AMC Pankration. At UFC 83 on April 19, 2008, Franklin faced Brazilian jiu-jitsu black belt Travis Lutter. During the bout, Lutter was able to secure a tight, high-level armbar, though Franklin was able to escape and go on to win the bout via TKO (strikes) at 3:01 of round two.

Move to Light Heavyweight
At UFC 88 on Sept. 6, 2008, Franklin made his return to the light heavyweight division against close friend and training partner Matt Hamill. Franklin won by TKO following a kick to Hamill's liver, which prompted the referee to call a stop to the fight at 0:39 of round three.

Franklin faced former PRIDE welterweight and middleweight champion Dan Henderson at UFC 93 in Dublin, Ireland on January 17, 2009 and lost by controversial split decision. Franklin became the first person to fight in a UFC main event in both Northern Ireland and the Republic of Ireland.

At UFC 99 in Cologne, Germany on June 13, 2009, Franklin defeated former Pride middleweight champion Wanderlei Silva via unanimous decision at a catchweight of 195 lbs. Franklin became the first person to fight in the UFC in four different countries in four consecutive fights.

At UFC 103 on September 19, 2009, Franklin lost to former UFC light heavyweight champion Vitor Belfort. This was Belfort's first bout in the UFC since February 2005. After a lengthy feeling-out process, Belfort connected with a left hook that dropped Franklin, and followed up with a flurry of left hands that ended the contest via TKO at 3:02 in the first round. Though it was logged as a clear win for Belfort, there was discussion over multiple illegal blows to the back of Franklin's head.

Franklin was rumored to face multiple-time UFC champion Randy Couture at UFC 115, but was eventually confirmed to face former UFC light heavyweight champion Chuck Liddell on June 12, 2010, following the withdrawal of Liddell's original opponent, Tito Ortiz. During the contest, Liddell showed improved striking from that seen in his recent fights, and more proficient kicks. In the final seconds of the opening round, Liddell connected with a head kick and moved forward to attack a stunned Franklin, only to be knocked out by a compact counter right hand at 4:55 of the round. During the post-fight press conference, Franklin confirmed that his left forearm had been broken by a head kick Liddell threw during the middle of the round. The injury did not require surgery, which allowed Franklin to recover faster.

Franklin faced former UFC light heavyweight champion Forrest Griffin on February 5, 2011 at UFC 126 and lost via unanimous decision.

Franklin was scheduled to face Antônio Rogério Nogueira at UFC 133 on August 6, 2011 in Philadelphia. Nogueira was forced out of the bout due to a shoulder injury. Unable to find a suitable replacement on short notice, the UFC pulled Franklin from the card.

Franklin faced Wanderlei Silva in a rematch, replacing Vitor Belfort, who suffered a hand injury, in the main event at catchweight on June 23, 2012 at UFC 147. Franklin won the fight via unanimous decision, with both participants earning Fight of the Night honors for their performances.

Return to Middleweight
Franklin returned to the middleweight division against former Strikeforce middleweight champion Cung Le on November 10, 2012 in the main event at UFC on Fuel TV 6.  He lost the fight via knockout in the first round.

Retirement from MMA
After teasing the possibility of one more MMA fight before retiring, Franklin instead announced his retirement on September 28, 2015. He penned a column on theplayerstribune.com explaining that a recent conversation with his mother helped make the decision, along with the understanding that “his body has slowed down.”

During the April 13, 2019 broadcast of UFC 236, it was announced that Franklin would be inducted into the UFC Hall of Fame.

Film career
Franklin made his acting debut in a film called Cyborg Soldier, in which he played an escaped super soldier and partnered with Tiffani Thiessen. In 2010, he starred in The Hammer, a story inspired by the life of deaf UFC fighter Matt Hamill. Franklin played MMA Coach Billings in the 2014 comedy Mantervention.

Championships and accomplishments

Mixed martial arts
Ultimate Fighting Championship
UFC Middleweight Championship (One time)
Two successful title defenses
Knockout of the Night (One time) vs. Chuck Liddell
Fight of the Night (Two times) vs. Wanderlei Silva (x2)
 Record for most significant strikes in a UFC Middleweight Championship bout vs. David Loiseau (127)
UFC Hall of Fame (Pioneer wing, class of 2019)
Sherdog
Mixed Martial Arts Hall of Fame

Mixed martial arts record

|-
| Loss
| align=center| 29–7 (1) 
| Cung Le
| KO (punch)
| UFC on Fuel TV: Franklin vs. Le
| 
| align=center| 1
| align=center| 2:17
| Macau, SAR, China
| 
|-
| Win
| align=center| 29–6 (1)
| Wanderlei Silva
| Decision (unanimous)
| UFC 147
| 
| align=center| 5
| align=center| 5:00
| Belo Horizonte, Brazil
| 
|-
| Loss
| align=center| 28–6 (1)
| Forrest Griffin
| Decision (unanimous)
| UFC 126
| 
| align=center| 3
| align=center| 5:00
| Las Vegas, Nevada, United States
|
|-
| Win
| align=center| 28–5 (1)
| Chuck Liddell
| KO (punch)
| UFC 115
| 
| align=center| 1
| align=center| 4:55
| Vancouver, British Columbia, Canada
| 
|-
| Loss
| align=center| 27–5 (1)
| Vitor Belfort
| TKO (punches)
| UFC 103
| 
| align=center| 1
| align=center| 3:02
| Dallas, Texas, United States
|  
|-
| Win
| align=center| 27–4 (1)
| Wanderlei Silva
| Decision (unanimous)
| UFC 99
| 
| align=center| 3
| align=center| 5:00
| Cologne, Germany
| 
|-
| Loss
| align=center| 26–4 (1)
| Dan Henderson
| Decision (split)
| UFC 93
| 
| align=center| 3
| align=center| 5:00
| Dublin, Ireland
| 
|-
| Win
| align=center| 26–3 (1)
| Matt Hamill
| TKO (kick to the body)
| UFC 88
| 
| align=center| 3
| align=center| 0:39
| Atlanta, Georgia, United States
| 
|-
| Win
| align=center| 25–3 (1)
| Travis Lutter
| TKO (punches)
| UFC 83
| 
| align=center| 2
| align=center| 3:01
| Montreal, Quebec, Canada
| 
|-
| Loss
| align=center| 24–3 (1)
| Anderson Silva
| TKO (knees)
| UFC 77
| 
| align=center| 2
| align=center| 1:07
| Cincinnati, Ohio, United States
| 
|-
| Win
| align=center| 24–2 (1)
| Yushin Okami
| Decision (unanimous)
| UFC 72
| 
| align=center| 3
| align=center| 5:00
| Belfast, Northern Ireland, United Kingdom
| 
|-
| Win
| align=center| 23–2 (1)
| Jason MacDonald
| TKO (corner stoppage)
| UFC 68
| 
| align=center| 2
| align=center| 5:00
| Columbus, Ohio, United States
| 
|-
| Loss
| align=center| 22–2 (1)
| Anderson Silva
| KO (knee)
| UFC 64
| 
| align=center| 1
| align=center| 2:59
| Las Vegas, Nevada, United States
| 
|-
| Win
| align=center| 22–1 (1)
| David Loiseau
| Decision (unanimous)
| UFC 58
| 
| align=center| 5
| align=center| 5:00
| Las Vegas, Nevada, United States
| 
|-
| Win
| align=center| 21–1 (1)
| Nate Quarry
| KO (punch)
| UFC 56
| 
| align=center| 1
| align=center| 2:34
| Las Vegas, Nevada, United States
| 
|-
| Win
| align=center| 20–1 (1)
| Evan Tanner
| TKO (doctor stoppage)
| UFC 53
| 
| align=center| 4
| align=center| 3:25
| Atlantic City, New Jersey, United States
| 
|-
| Win
| align=center| 19–1 (1)
| Ken Shamrock
| TKO (punches)
| The Ultimate Fighter 1 Finale
| 
| align=center| 1
| align=center| 2:42
| Las Vegas, Nevada, United States
| 
|-
| Win
| align=center| 18–1 (1)
| Curtis Stout
| TKO (submission to punches)
| SuperBrawl 38
| 
| align=center| 2
| align=center| 1:28
| Honolulu, Hawaii, United States
| 
|-
| Win
| align=center| 17–1 (1)
| Jorge Rivera
| Submission (armbar)
| UFC 50
| 
| align=center| 3
| align=center| 4:28
| Atlantic City, New Jersey, United States
| 
|-
| Win
| align=center| 16–1 (1)
| Ralph Dilon
| Submission (kimura)
| Alaska Fighting Championship
| 
| align=center| 1
| align=center| 0:56
| Anchorage, Alaska, United States
| 
|-
| Win
| align=center| 15–1 (1)
| Leo Sylvest
| TKO (submission to punches)
| SuperBrawl 35
| 
| align=center| 1
| align=center| 1:13
| Honolulu, Hawaii, United States
| 
|-
| Loss
| align=center| 14–1 (1)
| Lyoto Machida
| TKO (head kick and punches)
| Inoki Bom-Ba-Ye 2003
| 
| align=center| 2
| align=center| 1:03
| Kobe, Japan
| 
|-
| Win
| align=center| 14–0 (1)
| Edwin Dewees
| TKO (punches and knees)
| UFC 44
| 
| align=center| 1
| align=center| 3:32
| Las Vegas, Nevada, United States
|
|-
| Win
| align=center| 13–0 (1)
| Roberto Ramirez
| KO (punch)
| Battleground 1: War Cry
| 
| align=center| 1
| align=center| 0:10
| Villa Park, Illinois, United States
| 
|-
| Win
| align=center| 12–0 (1)
| Evan Tanner
| TKO (punches)
| UFC 42
| 
| align=center| 1
| align=center| 2:40
| Miami, Florida, United States
| 
|-
| Win
| align=center| 11–0 (1)
| Antony Rea
| TKO (punches)
| UCC Hawaii: Eruption in Hawaii
| 
| align=center| 1
| align=center| 2:46
| Honolulu, Hawaii, United States
| 
|-
| Win
| align=center| 10–0 (1)
| Yan Pellerin
| Submission (armbar)
| UCC 10: Battle for the Belts 2002
| 
| align=center| 1
| align=center| 3:23
| Hull, Quebec, Canada
| 
|-
| Win
| align=center| 9–0 (1)
| Marvin Eastman
| Submission (armbar)
| World Fighting Alliance 1
| 
| align=center| 1
| align=center| 1:02
| Las Vegas, Nevada, United States
| 
|-
| Win
| align=center| 8–0 (1)
| Dennis Reed
| TKO (submission to punches)
| Extreme Challenge Trials
| 
| align=center| 1
| align=center| 1:38
| Cincinnati, Ohio, United States
| 
|-
| Win
| align=center| 7–0 (1)
| Chris Seifert
| TKO (submission to punches)
| Extreme Challenge 41
| 
| align=center| 2
| align=center| 1:45
| Davenport, Iowa, United States
| 
|-
| Win
| align=center| 6–0 (1)
| Travis Fulton
| TKO (broken hand)
| Rings USA: Battle of Champions
| 
| align=center| 1
| align=center| 5:00
| Council Bluffs, Iowa, United States
| 
|-
| NC
| align=center| 5–0 (1)
| Aaron Brink
| No Contest (accidental foot injury)
| IFC: Warriors Challenge 11
| 
| align=center| 1
| align=center| 2:42
| Fresno, California, United States
| 
|-
| Win
| align=center| 5–0
| Dennis Reed
| Submission (armbar)
| Extreme Challenge 35
| 
| align=center| 1
| align=center| 1:56
| Davenport, Iowa, United States
| 
|-
| Win
| align=center| 4–0
| Gary Myers
| KO (head kick)
| WEF 9: World Class
| 
| align=center| 3
| align=center| 0:59
| Evansville, Indiana, United States
| 
|-
| Win
| align=center| 3–0
| Rob Smith
| TKO (punches)
| Extreme Challenge 31
| 
| align=center| 1
| align=center| 2:30
| Kenosha, Wisconsin, United States
| 
|-
| Win
| align=center| 2–0
| Eugene Pinault
| TKO (submission to punches)
| Extreme Challenge: Trials
| 
| align=center| 1
| align=center| 1:27
| Davenport, Iowa, United States
| 
|-
| Win
| align=center| 1–0
| Michael Martin
| KO (head kick)
| World Extreme Fighting 6
| 
| align=center| 1
| align=center| 0:21
| Wheeling, West Virginia, United States
|

Pay-Per-View Bouts

See also
 List of current UFC fighters
 List of male mixed martial artists

References

External links

Team American Fighter official Myspace
8weeksout.com
 
Official UFC Profile

1974 births
American male mixed martial artists
Middleweight mixed martial artists
Light heavyweight mixed martial artists
Mixed martial artists utilizing boxing
Mixed martial artists utilizing Muay Thai
Mixed martial artists utilizing Brazilian jiu-jitsu
Living people
Ultimate Fighting Championship champions
Ultimate Fighting Championship male fighters
Sportspeople from Cincinnati
American practitioners of Brazilian jiu-jitsu
People awarded a black belt in Brazilian jiu-jitsu
American Muay Thai practitioners
University of Cincinnati alumni
Mixed martial artists from Ohio
People from West Chester, Butler County, Ohio
ONE Championship